The 2003 Oregon State Beavers football team represented Oregon State University in the 2003 NCAA Division I-A football season. The Beavers offense scored 433 points while the defense allowed 301 points. Led by head coach Mike Riley, who returned to Oregon State after coaching the team in 1997 and 1998, the Beavers won the 2003 Las Vegas Bowl.

Schedule

Roster
QB Derek Anderson, Jr.

Season summary

Boise State

Source: ESPN

Arizona State

    
    
    
    
    
    
    
    
    
    

Steven Jackson 26 Rush, 105 Yds

Team players drafted into the NFL

References

Oregon State
Oregon State Beavers football seasons
Las Vegas Bowl champion seasons
Oregon State Beavers football